The British Aerospace Hawk 200 is a single-seat, single engine light multirole fighter designed for air defence, air denial, anti-shipping, interdiction, close air support, and ground attack.

Development 
In 1984, British Aerospace (now BAE Systems) decided to pursue development of a combat-orientated variant of the Hawk aircraft, designated as Hawk 200; up to this point the Hawk family had been typically employed by operators as an advanced trainer with secondary combat capabilities. A single flying demonstrator aircraft was produced to support the development process. This made its first flight on 19 May 1986.

Less than two months after first taking flight, the Hawk 200 demonstrator was lost in a fatal accident at Dunsfold Aerodrome, killing BAe test pilot Jim Hawkins; Hawkins is alleged to have either become disoriented or to have fallen unconscious, due to g-LOC (g induced loss of consciousness), while executing high-g manoeuvres to explore the aircraft's agility.

Despite the loss of the demonstrator, the company decided to proceed with the Hawk 200; by 1987, the first pre-production samples were being manufactured. In 1990, the Hawk 200 received its first order when Oman opted to procure a batch of twelve Hawk 203s, all of which were delivered by 1993.

Design

Overview 
The Hawk 200 is a single-seat, single engine light multirole fighter with a small visual signature and high manoeuvrability. It has a low-mounted cantilever wing and is powered by a single turbofan engine. The Hawk 200 differs from the earlier Hawks in having a new forward fuselage in which the forward cockpit area which normally houses a pilot is replaced by an electronics bay for avionics and onboard systems, including a fire control computer, multi-mode radar, laser rangefinder and forward-looking infrared (FLIR). The Hawk 200 also has an upgraded wing which, in addition to four wing pylons seen in previous Hawks, also has wingtip missile support as well as greater wing area, increased wing droop, larger flaps and an optional mid-air refuelling capability.

Weapons 

The Hawk 200 has 7 external store points with four underwing pylons, an under-fuselage pylon, and wingtip air-to-air missile stations.

The Hawk 200 can launch many NATO standard guided missiles including AIM-9L Sidewinder AAM, ASRAAM AAM, AIM-120 AMRAAM AAM, AGM-65 Maverick AGM. The Hawk 200 can also carry a variety of bombs, including 113 kg bombs, 240 kg bombs, 540 kg bombs and Paveway II guided bombs. The AIM-9L Sidewinder missiles are launched from the wingtip air-to-air missile stations on each wing.

Sensors 

The Hawk 200 is equipped with a Northrop Grumman AN/APG-66H multi-mode radar, LINS 300 ring laser gyroscope inertial navigation system, air data sensor, display processor and mission computer. The systems are connected with a dual MIL-STD-1553B digital bus. The Hawk 200 is also equipped with a Ferranti laser rangefinder and a Marconi forward-looking infrared. The self-protection systems include a BAE SkyGuardian 200 RWR and automatic or manual Vinten chaff/flare dispensers located above the engine exhaust.

The AN/APG-66 radar is a solid state medium range (up to ) pulse-doppler planar array radar designed by the Westinghouse Electric Corporation (now Northrop Grumman) for the F-16 Fighting Falcon. It has ten air-to-surface and ten air-to-ground modes for navigation and weapon aiming purposes. The APG-66H variant of the radar is installed on the Hawk 200, which has a smaller antenna for slightly reduced capabilities.

Cockpit 
The pilot has a hands-on throttle and stick (HOTAS) control system and a wide-field-of-view head-up display (HUD). Using the weapon control panel, which controls the stores management system, the pilot can select the weapons and release mode prior to initiating an attack.

As in all other modernised Hawks, the Hawk 200's all-glass cockpit has a multi-functional colour display, with a dedicated processor and 15-colour graphics symbology generator. There are 27 display formats which provide flight and aircraft data. The cockpit is also compatible with night-vision goggles. Just outside of the cockpit is an inflight refuelling probe.

Engine 

The Hawk 200 was originally powered by an Adour 871 two shaft, low bypass ratio turbofan engine from Rolls-Royce Turbomeca, providing the aircraft with 26.00 kN of thrust. In 2005, the Adour 951 engine was certified for use on the Hawk 200. The improved Adour 951 has improved performance (rated at  thrust) and has up to twice the service life of the Adour Mk 871. It features an all-new fan and combustor, revised HP and LP turbines, and introduces Full Authority Digital Engine Control (FADEC).

Both engines are non-afterburning versions of the Adour series, and are fed by air intakes on both sides of the fuselage. The internal fuel tanks are installed in the fuselage and compartmented integral tanks located in the wings, containing up to 1361 kg of fuel. Up to two 591-liter drop tanks can also be carried on the inboard underwing pylons.

Operational history

Malaysia 
On 5 March 2013, amidst the 2013 Lahad Datu standoff, 5 Hawk 208s aircraft, along with 3 F-18D Hornets of the Royal Malaysian Air Force, were deployed in airstrikes on hideouts of the defunct sultanate and terrorist group Royal Security Forces of the Sultanate of Sulu in Lahad Datu, Sabah Malaysia ahead of the ground assault by joint forces of the Malaysian Army and Royal Malaysia Police.

The Hawk 208s flew 15 sorties, each Hawk 200 dropping Mk 82 unguided bombs in the first sortie and firing CRV7 rockets at additional ground targets on the second and third. A spokesman for Malaysian Prime Minister Najib Razak said in a phone interview that the objective of the airstrikes was to "soften the ground before troops move in".

Variants 
Hawk 203 Export version for the Royal Air Force of Oman
Hawk 205 Proposed export version for the Royal Saudi Air Force
Hawk 208 Export version for the Royal Malaysian Air Force; only version equipped with a mid-air refueling probe.
Hawk 209 Export version for the Indonesian Air Force

Operators 

Operator figures from flightglobal and

Indonesian Air Force – 23 in active service
No. 1 Air Squadron
No. 12 Air Squadron

Royal Malaysian Air Force – 13 aircraft left operational from an original of 18
No. 6 Squadron
No. 15 Squadron

Royal Air Force of Oman – 11 aircraft left operational from an original of 12
No. 6 Squadron

Specifications

See also

References

External links

 RAF Hawk T1/1A trainer page
 BAE Systems Hawk fact sheet

BAE Systems Hawk
1980s British attack aircraft
Single-engined jet aircraft
Low-wing aircraft
Aircraft first flown in 1986